Jeremy David Moir (born 13 April 1957) is a Maltese-born Scottish former cricketer.

A twin, Moir was born in April 1957 to Scottish parents who lived in British Malta. Shortly after his birth, his parents moved to Norway, where they spent four years. They subsequently returned to Scotland, where Moir was educated at Aberdeen Grammar School. He made his debut for Scotland in a List A one-day match against Yorkshire at Leeds in the 1989 NatWest Trophy. He played one-day cricket for Scotland until 1992, making fourteen appearances across the Benson & Hedges Cup and the NatWest Trophy. Playing as a bowler in the Scottish side, Moir struggled against county opposition, taking 7 wickets at an expensive average of 79.85. In addition to playing one-day cricket for Scotland, Moir also appeared in two first-class matches against Ireland at Dublin in 1989 and Edinburgh in 1990. His twin brother, Dallas, was also a cricketer.

References

External links
 

1957 births
Living people
Scottish twins
Twin sportspeople
People from Mtarfa
People educated at Aberdeen Grammar School
Scottish cricketers